The 1922 Committee, formally known as the Conservative Private Members' Committee, is the parliamentary group of the Conservative Party in the House of Commons of the United Kingdom. The committee, consisting of all Conservative backbench members of Parliament, meets weekly while Parliament is in session and provides a way for backbenchers to co-ordinate and discuss their views independently of frontbenchers. Its executive membership and officers are by consensus limited to backbench MPs, although since 2010 frontbench Conservative MPs have an open invitation to attend meetings.

The committee can also play an important role in choosing the party leader. The group was formed in 1923 (by MPs who were elected in 1922) but became important after 1940. The committee, collectively, represents the views of the Conservative Party parliamentary rank and file to the party leader, who is usually also the prime minister of the United Kingdom or leader of the Opposition. Whips are present but their role is limited to announcing future business and reporting questions and complaints to the chief whip.

Committee constitutional matters
The 1922 Committee has an 18-member executive committee, whose members are elected by all Conservative MPs except those who are members of the Government, i.e. the electorate comprises all "backbench" Conservative MPs. Candidates need to be nominated by two Conservative colleagues, and it is a first-past-the-post voting system, meaning the person with the most votes in each category wins.

The committee oversees the election of party leaders, or any Conservative party-led vote of confidence in a current leader. Such a vote can be triggered by 15% of Conservative MPs (currently 54 MPs out of the 360 sitting Conservative MPs ) writing a letter to the chairman of the committee asking for such a vote. This process was used most recently on 6 June 2022, against Boris Johnson. The last time a leader lost such a vote was on 29 October 2003, when Iain Duncan Smith was defeated by 90 to 75. However both May and Johnson chose to resign within a year of their confidence votes.

Origins
The name does not, as is sometimes wrongly supposed, stem from the 19 October 1922 Carlton Club meeting, in which Conservative MPs successfully demanded that the party withdraw from the coalition government of David Lloyd George, and which triggered the 1922 general election. The committee was formed following the election, in April 1923.

The MPs who founded the committee were not the same as those who had taken the decision to end the 1916–1922 coalition government. It began as a small dining group of new members elected in 1922. The committee soon developed into a ginger group of active backbenchers. After the 1923 and 1924 elections, the membership expanded as more new Conservative MPs were elected, and in 1926 all backbench MPs were invited to become members. It became known as the Conservative Private Members' Committee. Consequently, it became a platform for the majority rather than a focus for discontent.

The term "men in grey suits", meaning a delegation of Conservative MPs who tell a party leader that it is time for them to step down without forcing an open challenge, is often used in reference to members of the 1922 Committee. It became popular following the resignation of Margaret Thatcher.

2010 changes
On 19 May 2010, shortly after the Conservatives had formed a coalition government with the Liberal Democrats, Prime Minister David Cameron suggested altering the committee to involve frontbench ministers in the recommendation forming process, angering some backbench MPs. On 20 May 2010, committee members voted to approve the change, with 168 votes in favour and 118 against. Many backbench party members criticised the move and voted against it, while ministers had argued such a change would be necessary to continue operating coherently as a party during its membership of a coalition government.

However, under Graham Brady, who became chairman in 2010, it was clarified shortly after that vote that although frontbenchers became eligible to attend meetings of the committee, only backbenchers would be able to vote for its officers and executive committee, similarly to the Parliamentary Labour Party.

Current executive committee
As of 11 July 2022, the executive committee comprised:

Chairman
Sir Graham Brady
Joint Vice-Chairmen
William Wragg
Nus Ghani
Joint Executive secretaries
Bob Blackman
Gary Sambrook
Treasurer
Sir Geoffrey Clifton-Brown
Executive members:
Aaron Bell
Miriam Cates
Jo Gideon
Richard Graham
Chris Green
Robert Halfon
Sally-Ann Hart
Andrew Jones
Tom Randall
David Simmonds
John Stevenson
Martin Vickers

Former chairs

Gervais Rentoul (1923–1932)
William Morrison (1932–1935)
Hugh O'Neill (1935–1939)
Patrick Spens (1939–1940)
Alexander Erskine-Hill (1940–1944)
John McEwen (1944–1945)
Arnold Gridley (1946–1951)
Derek Walker-Smith (1951–1955)
John Morrison (1955–1964)
William Anstruther-Gray (1964–1966)
Arthur Vere Harvey (1966–1970)
Harry Legge-Bourke (1970–1972)
Edward du Cann (1972–1984)
Cranley Onslow (1984–1992)
Marcus Fox (1992–1997)
Archie Hamilton (1997–2001)
Michael Spicer (2001–2010)

Secretaries
 Victor Goodhew (1979–1983)
 Jill Knight (1983–1987)

See also
 Parliamentary Labour Party
 Parliamentary group

References

Further reading
 
 
 

Organisation of the Conservative Party (UK)
1923 establishments in the United Kingdom